Simri is a village  in the district of Darbhanga, Bihar, India. According to the 2001 census it had a population of 10,436.

References

Cities and towns in Darbhanga district